Archer County is a county located in the U.S. state of Texas. As of the 2020 census, its population was 8,560. Its county seat is Archer City. It is part of the Wichita Falls metropolitan statistical area.

History
In 1858, the Texas Legislature established Archer County from portions of Fannin County, Texas, and it organized in 1880. It is named for Branch Tanner Archer, a commissioner for the Republic of Texas.

Geography

Major highways
  U.S. Highway 82
  U.S. Highway 277
  U.S. Highway 281
  State Highway 25
  State Highway 79
  State Highway 114

Adjacent counties
 Wichita County (north)
 Clay County (east)
 Jack County (southeast)
 Young County (south)
 Baylor County (west)
 Wilbarger County (northwest)

Geology

Archer County is part of the Texas Red Beds, which are strata of red-colored sedimentary rock from the Early Permian. One of the most prominent red-bed fossil sites in the county is the Geraldine Bonebed. The fossils of Permian-period vertebrates in the Texas Red Beds were first discovered by Edward Drinker Cope in 1877. Subsequent research has revealed rare fossils of Permian period amphibians such as Trimerorhachis, and rich deposits of other Permian tetrapods such as Dimetrodon and Diadectes.

Demographics

As of the census of 2000,  8,854 people, 3,345 households, and 2,515 families resided in the county.  The population density was 10 people/sq mi (4/km2).  The 3,871 housing units averaged 4/sq mi (2/km2).  The racial makeup of the county was 95.54% White, 0.08% African American, 0.62% Native American, 0.12% Asian, 0.03% Pacific Islander, 2.28% from other races, and 1.32% from two or more races.  About 4.87% of the population was Hispanic or Latino of any race.

Of the 3,345 households, 37.20% had children under 18 living with them, 65.00% were married couples living together, 7.20% had a female householder with no husband present, and 24.80% were not families. Of all unmarried partner households, 89.8% were heterosexual, 1.9% were same-sex male, and 8.3% were same-sex female. About 21.90% of all households were made up of individuals, and 10.20% had someone who was 65 or older living alone.  The average household size was 2.63, and the average family size was 3.08.

In the county, the age distribution was  28.20% under  18, 7.00% from 18 to 24, 27.40% from 25 to 44, 23.50% from 45 to 64, and 13.90% who were 65 or older.  The median age was 38 years. For every 100 females, there were 100.20 males.  For every 100 females age 18 and over, there were 96.20 males.

The median income for a household in the county was $38,514, and for a family was $45,984. Males had a median income of $31,386 versus $22,119 for females. The per capita income for the county was $19,300.  About 6.80% of families and 9.00% of the population were below the poverty line, including 9.90% of those under age 18 and 10.80% of those age 65 or over.

Education
These school districts serve Archer County:
 Archer City Independent School District
 Holliday Independent School District
 Iowa Park Consolidated Independent School District (partial)
 Jacksboro Independent School District (partial)
 Olney Independent School District (partial)
 Windthorst Independent School District

Megargel Independent School District once served portions of Archer County, but it closed in 2006.

The county is in the service area of Vernon College.

Ranching industry
The Seymour Division of the sprawling 320,000-deeded-acre (1400 km2) La Escalera Ranch is located north of Seymour, Texas in Baylor County with portions in Archer County. The Seymour Division consists of 34,000 acres (12,000 ha), which formerly was known as the Cross Bar Ranch when it was owned by the Claude Cowan Sr. Trust.  The ranch was purchased in January, 2005 by the Gerald Lyda family and La Escalera Limited Partnership, and is managed by partner Jo Lyda Granberg and her husband K. G. Granberg of Seymour. La Escalera Ranch also extends over much of Pecos County and portions of Reeves and Brewster Counties. It is known for its herd of Black Angus cattle and its abundant wildlife.

Joseph Sterling Bridwell, a Wichita Falls philanthropist and oilman, also owned a ranch in Archer County.

Dairy industry 
Archer County is one of the more prominent areas of dairy product production in Texas.  The two southeastern Archer County cities of Scotland and Windthorst have 37 functioning dairy farms nearby as of 2019. The dairy industry moved to the area in the early 1900s and has persisted through the years.  Though this area has many operating dairies, the number of dairy cattle makes up a fractions of the numbers that are raised in the other dairy pockets of Texas such as Dalhart/Dumas and the Stephenville area. Every dairy farm in the Scotland/Windthorst area is family owned, and this is from where most of the economy of the two cities derives.

Politics
Archer County is represented in the Texas House of Representatives by Republican James Frank, a businessman from Wichita Falls.
Archer County is heavily Republican, and has voted for the presidential candidate of that party in every election since 1980.

Communities

Cities
Archer City (county seat)
Holliday
Scotland

Towns
Lakeside City
Megargel
Windthorst (partly in Clay County)

Unincorporated communities
Dads Corner
Dundee
Mankins

Ghost towns
Anarene
Huff

See also

List of museums in North Texas
National Register of Historic Places listings in Archer County, Texas
Recorded Texas Historic Landmarks in Archer County

References

External links

Archer County government

Archer County from the Texas Almanac
Archer County from the TXGenWeb Project
Historic Archer County materials, hosted by the Portal to Texas History

 
1880 establishments in Texas
Wichita Falls metropolitan area
Populated places established in 1880